Mateus Quaresma Correia (born 22 August 1996), sometimes known as just Quaresma, is a Brazilian professional footballer who plays as a left-back for Arouca.

Career
Quaresma began his career with the Brazilian club Lajeadense, and followed that with successive loans with Londrina, Cuiabá, America RJ, and Cascavel. He made his professional debut with Lajeadense in a 1–1 Campeonato Gaúcho tie with Internacional on 1 February 2015. On 1 October 2020, Quaresma transferred to the Portuguese club Arouca.

References

External links
 
 

1996 births
Living people
Sportspeople from Rio Grande do Sul
Brazilian footballers
Clube Esportivo Lajeadense players
Londrina Esporte Clube players
Cuiabá Esporte Clube players
America Football Club (RJ) players
F.C. Arouca players
Primeira Liga players
Liga Portugal 2 players
Campeonato Brasileiro Série B players
Campeonato Brasileiro Série D players
Association football fullbacks
Brazilian expatriate footballers
Brazilian expatriates in Portugal
Expatriate footballers in Portugal